Frank Tenison Brennan (6 December 1884 – 6 August 1949) was a Labor Party politician, lawyer and Supreme Court judge. He was a Queensland MLA from 1918 to 1925.

History
Born in Maryborough the son of Martin Brennan and educated at the Christian Brothers' College there, served his articles at Warwick, Queensland, with his brother E. J. Brennan, and qualified in 1912, heading the list of that year. He practised as a solicitor in Toowoomba from 1912 to 1918. He was active in the anti-conscription campaign.

He was elected to the Queensland Legislative Assembly for Toowoomba in 1923, defeating James Tolmie. He was appointed Minister in Charge of Health and Local Authorities, and the following year, Education Minister. The same year he was admitted to the Bar, and in 1925 he was elevated to the Supreme Court and retired from parliament.

The bribery case
On 14 August 1922, two men, Sleeman and Connolly, were arrested for having attempted to bribe Mr Brennan. It was established at their trial that the object was to induce Mr Brennan to cross the House to bring down the Government. It was stated that he was offered £3500. The men were trapped at Mr Brennan's house, where holes had been bored in the walls to allow detectives and shorthand writers to obtain a complete record of their conversation. They were sentenced to three months' imprisonment, and fined £500 each.

Supreme Court
In 1925 he was elevated to the Supreme Court Bench on the retirement of Mr. Justice Shand; from 1925 until 1947 he was stationed in Central Queensland, and for his last two years in Brisbane.

Last days
Mr. Justice Brennan died in the Mater Private Hospital, Brisbane, where he had been admitted several weeks previously, suffering from heart trouble. He was honoured by a State funeral and buried at Nudgee Cemetery.

Family
Frank Brennan married Hanna Maria Gertrude Koenig, on 19 July 1922. Gertrude was a daughter of prominent Brisbane citizen Albert Koenig, a German Australian.

Mr. Justice Brennan left a wife, son Gerard, who was studying law, and daughters Anne (his associate) and Mary.

See also
Members of the Queensland Legislative Assembly, 1918–1920; 1920-1923; 1923-1926

References

Further references
Malcolm Cope, 'Brennan, Frank Tenison (1884–1949)', Australian Dictionary of Biography, National Centre of Biography, Australian National University, http://adb.anu.edu.au/biography/brennan-frank-tenison-5348/text9043, accessed 24 May 2013.

Members of the Queensland Legislative Assembly
Australian barristers
Judges of the Supreme Court of Queensland
Australian Roman Catholics
1884 births
1949 deaths
Burials at Nudgee Cemetery
Australian people of Irish descent
Australian Labor Party members of the Parliament of Queensland
20th-century Australian politicians